Michal Václavík (born 3 April 1976, in Karviná) is a Czech football goalkeeper currently playing for FC Hlučín. He played over 100 matches in the Gambrinus Liga.

External links
 
 
 
 Player profile on Zagłębie Lubin club website

1976 births
Living people
Sportspeople from Karviná
Czech footballers
Czech Republic youth international footballers
Czech Republic under-21 international footballers
SK Slavia Prague players
Bohemians 1905 players
FC Zbrojovka Brno players
FC Hlučín players
Zagłębie Lubin players
Górnik Zabrze players
Association football goalkeepers
Expatriate footballers in Poland
Czech expatriate sportspeople in Poland
Czech First League players